= Larry L. Perkins =

American politician

Member of the Iowa House of Representatives
- In office 1969–1971

Personal details
- Born: January 8, 1937 (age 89) Des Moines, Iowa, United States
- Party: Republican
- Occupation: Decorator

Larry L. Perkins (born January 8, 1937) was an American politician in the state of Iowa.

Perkins was born in Des Moines, Iowa. He attended the Drake University and was a decorator. He served in the Iowa House of Representatives from 1969 to 1971 as a Republican.
